Belhezar may refer to:
 Belhezar-e Bala
 Belhezar-e Pain